Poser criteria are diagnostic criteria for multiple sclerosis (MS). They replaced the older Schumacher criteria, and now they are considered obsolete as McDonald criteria have superseded them. Nevertheless, some of the concepts introduced have remained in MS research, like CDMS (clinical definite MS), and newer criteria are often calibrated against them. The criteria were unveiled in the Annals of Neurology in 1983 by a team lead by Dr. Charles M. Poser.

The article that introduced them also defined the concepts of attack, historical information, clinical evidence, paraclinical evidence, lesion typical of MS, remission, separate lesions and laboratory support, which are necessary to apply the criteria.

The criteria considers MS as the presence of demyelinating lesions disseminated in time and space, and they are oriented specially to prove the dissemination. Based on this, the authors defined a set of rules that can yield five conclusions: CDMS, LSDMS, CPMS, LSPMS or noMS. Poser diagnosis of CDMS is known to have a sensitivity of 87% respect postmortem autopsy examination

Definitions
Poser et al. define several concepts. The most important for diagnosis are:
 Attack: Occurrence of a symptom of neurological dysfunction for more than 24 hours
 Clinical evidence: Neurological dysfunction demonstrable by neurological examination
 Paraclinical evidence: Demonstration by any test of the existence of a non-clinical lesion in the CNS

Diagnosis conclusions
The criteria can yield five conclusions:

Summary of requirements
Any of the five conclusions have subpossibilities. Here a table is shown with each one of them:

If none of these requirements is accomplished, the diagnosis is "No MS", meaning that there is not enough clinical evidence to support a clinical diagnosis of MS.

Sensitivity and specificity

Poser diagnosis of CDMS was initially reported to have a sensitivity of 87% respect postmortem autopsy examination. Poser criteria were published in 1983 and their sensitivity increased with time. For example, in 1988 a 94% specificity vs. postmortem analysis was reported  Anyway, in initial cases, the sensitivity was low respect pathologically defined MS because around 25% of MS cases are silent MS cases.

Two pathologically disseminated inflammatory demyelinating lesions should be considered MS even if they are silent. Therefore, Poser criteria should be considered as deprecated.

Extension of the concepts
As more knowledge about the underlying pathology of MS has been gathered, the concepts of subclinical, preclinical and CIS have been used together with the Poser original classification.

The first manifestation of MS is the so-called clinically isolated syndrome, or CIS, which is the first isolated attack. The Poser diagnosis criteria for MS does not allow doctors normally to give an MS diagnosis until a second attack takes place. Therefore, the concept of "clinical MS", for a MS that can be diagnosed is sometimes too strong because until MS diagnosis has been established, nobody can tell whether the disease dealing with is MS.

Cases of MS before the CIS are sometimes found during other neurological inspections and are referred to as "subclinical MS". "Preclinical MS" refers to cases after the CIS but before the confirming second attack. After the second confirming attack the situation is referred to as CDMS (clinically defined multiple sclerosis).

References

Autoimmune diseases
Neurological disorders
Neurobiological brain disorder
Multiple sclerosis